Abraham Munabi (born 19 December 1940) is a Ugandan athlete. He competed in the men's triple jump at the 1972 Summer Olympics.

References

External links 
 

1940 births
Living people
Athletes (track and field) at the 1970 British Commonwealth Games
Athletes (track and field) at the 1972 Summer Olympics
Ugandan male triple jumpers
Olympic athletes of Uganda
Place of birth missing (living people)
African Games medalists in athletics (track and field)
African Games silver medalists for Uganda
Athletes (track and field) at the 1973 All-Africa Games
Commonwealth Games competitors for Uganda